List of steroids may refer to:

 List of androgens/anabolic steroids – steroidal androgens/anabolic steroids
 List of androgens/anabolic steroids (alternate) – steroidal androgens/anabolic steroids
 List of steroidal antiandrogens – steroidal antiandrogens
 List of estrogens – estrogens
 List of progestogens – progestogens
 List of corticosteroids – corticosteroids, including both glucocorticoids and mineralocorticoids
 List of neurosteroids – excitatory, inhibitory, mixed, neurotrophic, antineurotrophic, and other neurosteroids, as well as pheromones and pherines
 List of steroidogenesis inhibitors – steroidogenesis inhibitors, or inhibitors of steroid biosynthesis and metabolism

As well as lists of steroid esters, including:

 List of androgen esters – androgen esters
 List of estrogen esters – estrogen esters
 List of progestogen esters – progestogen esters
 List of corticosteroid esters – corticosteroid esters

See also
 List of steroid esters
 List of steroid medications available in the United States

References

Steroids
Steroids
Lists of lists